David Bergner is a German football manager and former player who manages FC Teutonia Ottensen of the Regionalliga Nord. He previously managed the youth team of Dynamo Dresden, FC Rot-Weiß Erfurt, and Chemnitzer FC. As a player, he played for 1. FC Union Berlin, Sachsen Leipzig, 1. FC Nürnberg, 1. FC Schweinfurt 05 and Hallescher FC.

References

Living people
1973 births
German footballers
Association football defenders
Footballers from Berlin
1. FC Union Berlin players
FC Sachsen Leipzig players
1. FC Nürnberg players
1. FC Schweinfurt 05 players
Hallescher FC players
2. Bundesliga players
Oberliga (football) players
Regionalliga players
German football managers
Dynamo Dresden non-playing staff
FC Rot-Weiß Erfurt managers
Chemnitzer FC managers
3. Liga managers
Regionalliga managers